Castlemartin is a village and parish in the community of Stackpole and Castlemartin, Pembrokeshire, Wales, in the Pembrokeshire Coast National Park.

Geography
In chronostratigraphy, the British sub-stage of the Carboniferous period, the 'Arundian' derives its name from Hobbyhorse Bay in the Castlemartin communityarundo being the Latin for hobby horse. Castlemartin has  of coastline, much of it consisting of spectacular limestone cliffs characterised by large sea caves, natural arches and stacks.

History 

The village of Castlemartin was in the ancient Hundred of the same name, once centred on a prominent Norman motte-and-bailey castle giving, with the church dedicated to St Martin, the origin of the name. Like other places in southern Pembrokeshire, Castlemartin has been mainly English-speaking for 900 years or more.

A 1583 map in the British Library shows Castlemartin parish as Castlemerten.

The census population of Castlemartin was 496 (1801): 528 (1851): 460 (1901): 243 (1951): 147 (2001).

During the 20th century, much of the land in the community area was cleared by the government for use as an artillery range: Castlemartin Training Area, with its base at Merrion, in Warren. Here, the Pembrokeshire Coast Path has to run inland; by-passing many interesting sections of cliff, although sometimes access may be offered to Flimston. In 2011, the MoD opened up a special diversionary route which was safer for walkers by protecting them from the range fire and preventing them for having to negotiate narrow country roads with fast moving traffic.

Castlemartin community amalgamated with Stackpole community in 2012, forming Stackpole and Castlemartin community.

Parish church

The parish church of St Michael is a Grade I listed building. It contains a cross-inscribed stone pillar of the 7th century-9th century. Currently, the church is closed. The church was declared redundant and vested with the Friends of Friendless Churches in 2016.

References

External links

 Further historical information and links on GENUKI
 Public Information on Army Range
 Joint Nature Conservation Committee
 Photographs of Castlemartin and surrounding area on Geograph
 Castlemartin at HistoryofWales.com

Villages in Pembrokeshire
Former communities in Pembrokeshire